Kirsty Jackson Young (born 23 November 1968) is a Scottish television and radio presenter.

From 2006 to 2018 she was the main presenter of BBC Radio 4's Desert Island Discs. She presented Crimewatch on BBC One from 2008 to 2015.

Early life 
Young was born in East Kilbride. She attended Cambusbarron Primary School and Stirling High School. She returned in June 2008 to officially open the school's new building. She shared with viewers that she had suffered from bulimia as a teenager on the first episode of her first TV show. In a later interview she said "It only happened for a very fleeting few months and I dealt with it myself."

Young decided not to attend university and her media career began as a runner and then as a researcher.

Career 
Young became a continuity announcer for BBC Radio Scotland in 1989. In 1992 she moved to Scottish Television as a presenter of Scotland Today and which resulted in her  chat show, Kirsty. She left Scotland Today in 1996 to become a relief presenter for The Time, The Place and appeared on the Holiday programme. She co-hosted a consumer show The Street on BBC Two.

In March 1997, she joined the news team of the new terrestrial channel, Channel 5, presenting the channel's flagship news programme Channel 5 News. Young then left Channel 5 to join ITV in 2000 and briefly hosted the quiz show The People Versus. In 2001, she became a co-presenter of the ITV Evening News. Later the same year, after giving birth to her first child, she decided to return to Channel 5 to again front Channel 5 News on 14 January 2002.

In November 2003, Young presented an edition of Have I Got News for You. She has since featured on the show a further eleven times. In 2004, she made a memorable appearance on Room 101 during which she humorously nominated cowboy boots, Britney Spears, Brazilian waxes and 'baby on board' stickers among her pet hates.

In June 2006, Young was announced as the new presenter of the long-running BBC Radio 4 programme Desert Island Discs, replacing Sue Lawley; she began on 1 October 2006. According to the odds given by bookmaker William Hill she was an outsider for the job at 20/1. She returned to Five News on 28 September 2006, but in 2007, Young announced that she would be leaving Channel 5 News in the autumn, following ten years as its head anchor since the programme's inception on the same day as Channel 5's launch (30 March), a decade earlier. On 29 August 2007, she presented her last show.

On 29 September, a month after leaving Channel 5 - the BBC announced Young would succeed Fiona Bruce as the presenter of Crimewatch. She presented the show from January 2008 until December 2015.

From 11 January 2010 she presented a four-part BBC TV series entitled The British Family. In March–April 2011, she presented the TV series The British at Work.

On 31 August 2018 it was announced that Young would be stepping down from Desert Island Discs "for a number of months" to receive treatment for a form of fibromyalgia, and that Lauren Laverne would deputise during this period. In July 2019, Young announced that she was to stand down as the host of Desert Island Discs, saying: "Having been forced to take some months away from my favourite job because of health problems, I'm happy to say I'm now well on the way to feeling much better. But that enforced absence from the show has altered my perspective on what I should do next and so I've decided it's time to pursue new challenges". The BBC's Director of Radio and Education, James Purnell, called Young a "wonderful host". It was confirmed that Lauren Laverne of Radio 6 Music would be continuing in Young's role "for the foreseeable future".

Young and her husband purchased Inchconnachan, an island on Loch Lomond, with the intention of building holiday lets on the island. The island has been the home of a colony of wild wallabies who have lived on the island for 80 years, having first been introduced in the 1940s. To make way for the holiday lets, Young and her husband are considering relocating the wallabies though this has seen some opposition. The island is an area of Special Scientific Interest and conservation area.

On 2 June 2022, Young presented Platinum Beacons: Lighting up the Jubilee; BBC One's live coverage of the lighting of more than 1,500 beacons to celebrate the Queen's 70-year reign.

Young fronted the later part of the BBC's television coverage of the state funeral of Elizabeth II at St George's Chapel, Windsor Castle on 19 September 2022. She received praise for her closing monologue at the end of the broadcast.

Personal life 
Young has had no contact with her biological father. Her de facto father is John, a trained joiner.

She previously dated rugby player, Kenny Logan, separating after 3 years. She met and then married businessman Nick Jones, the founder of Soho House club. She has two daughters with Jones and two stepchildren, Jones' children from his first marriage to Tania. 

On Christmas Day 2022, Young appeared as the Interviewee on Desert Island Discs, the programme that she had hosted up until 2018, when she stepped down for well documented health reasons, suffering from fibromyalgia and rheumatoid arthritis. As her Island luxury item, Young chose to have a home cinema, with a full access to a library of every film she had ever watched. 

Young and Jones purchased their own uninhabited Loch Lomond Island in Scotland, their proposed development plans has attracted criticism from local conservationists in 2022.

Appointments 
In 2016 Young was appointed president of Unicef UK, her successor in 2020 is actress Olivia Colman.

In October 2019 she was appointed as a Director of Sussex Royal, The Foundation of the Duke and Duchess of Sussex and served until the Foundation was dissolved in July 2020.

References

External links
Kirsty Young at the British Film Institute

1968 births
Living people
People educated at Stirling High School
ITN newsreaders and journalists
People from East Kilbride
Scottish journalists
Scottish women journalists
Scottish television presenters
Scottish women television presenters
British women television presenters
BBC Radio Scotland presenters
STV News newsreaders and journalists
5 News presenters and reporters